In the 1948–49 season, MC Alger competed in the Division Honneur for the 13th season French colonial era, as well as the Forconi Cup. They competed in Division Honneur, and the North African Cup.

Friendly

Competitions

Overview

Division Honneur

League table

Results by round

Matches

Forconi Cup

Squad information

Playing statistics
All except round 18 and 4th Round Cup.

|-
! colspan=10 style=background:#dcdcdc; text-align:center| Goalkeepers

|-
! colspan=10 style=background:#dcdcdc; text-align:center| 

|}

Goalscorers
Includes all competitive matches. The list is sorted alphabetically by surname when total goals are equal.

Notes

References

MC Alger seasons
MC Alger